O'Gorman High School is a Catholic high school located in Timmins, Ontario, Canada for grades 9–12.

The school was founded in 1953 and named for John Robert O'Gorman (1880–1948), a Catholic priest who served in the area from 1926 to 1948.

See also
List of high schools in Ontario

References

High schools in Timmins
Educational institutions in Canada with year of establishment missing